Wilmington Hammerheads FC was a semi-professional American soccer team based in Wilmington, North Carolina. Founded in 1996, the team last competed in the Premier Development League, the fourth tier of the American Soccer Pyramid in 2017.

History
The Hammerheads had one championship in 2003, and were a finalist in 2002 and 2012, losing to the Long Island Rough Riders 2–1 in 2002 and losing 0–1 to the Charleston Battery in 2012. Wilmington found great success in the US Open Cup in their later years, regularly drawing MLS teams in the late rounds. Their most famous result occurred in 2003 when they drew the Dallas Burn, an MLS team, in the middle of a particularly bad year. They shocked the soccer world by defeating the Burn 4–1 at Legion Sports Complex before bowing out to D.C. United 1–0 in the quarterfinal round. The Hammerheads regularly drew well over 2,000 fans per game, and had drawn nearly 5,000 for playoff games. On June 30, 2009, the Hammerheads upset the Chicago Fire in the third round of the 2009 US Open Cup 1–0 at home.

The team went on hiatus in 2010 and returned for the 2011 USL PRO regular season, due to local businessman Bill Rudisill and a minority ownership group combining their efforts and financial support to the Port City. Following the 2011 USL PRO regular season, the Hammerheads competed in the division semifinals. In 2012, the Hammerheads finished their regular season with an overall record of 10–7–7 After qualifying for playoffs, they defeated both the Richmond Kickers and Orlando City Lions to obtain their spot in the finals versus the Charleston Battery whom took the 2012 USL PRO Championship title at Blackbaud Stadium after defeating the Hammerheads 1–0. The Hammerheads fell short of qualifying for a playoff position following their 2013 regular season.

In 2013, Daniel Steres led the team in goals with seven. He received the team's Most Valuable Player award, and was named to the 2013 USL PRO All-League Second Team. 

In September 2013, the Wilmington Hammerheads announced that after three years of dedicated ownership, Bill Rudisill would no longer be majority owner of the team and that George Altirs, CEO of Capelli New York, has taken the role of Wilmington Hammerheads Owner.

In January 2014, the Wilmington Hammerheads entered a developmental partnership deal with Major League Soccer side Toronto FC that would see a minimum of four Toronto players come to Wilmington with the goal of gaining first team experience. In August 2014, the Hammerheads' longtime head coach, Englishman David Irving, stepped down from his position following fifteen seasons with the club.

New York City FC announced a one-year affiliation with the Hammerheads in January 2015, in which NYCFC can send players to train and play in Wilmington for further development.

On August 1, 2016, it was reported that the Hammerheads were planning another hiatus from the USL, beginning with the 2017 season.  This would allow the club to restructure "in order to keep pace with the growth in stature of the USL."  Six weeks later, the Washington Post reported that the Hammerheads were a possible contender to move to Baltimore, Maryland for the 2018 season, noting that Wilmington is the smallest of the league's twenty-nine markets. The team self-relegated to the Premier Development League on September 29, 2016.

After the 2017 season, the PDL team was disbanded. The organization continues as a youth soccer academy under the name "Wilmington Hammerheads Youth FC".

Stadium
Legion Stadium: Wilmington, North Carolina (2003–2009, 2011–2016)
UNCW Soccer Stadium: Wilmington, North Carolina (2017)

Notable former players

Head coaches
 David Irving (1998–2014)
 Carson Porter (2014–2015)
 Mark Briggs (2015–2016)

Achievements
USL PRO Championship Finalist 2012
USL Second Division Regular Season Champions 2009
USL Pro Select League Champions 2003
USL D-3 Pro League Southern Division Champions 2002
USL D-3 Pro League Southern Division Champions 2001

Record

Year-by-year

Supporters
The primary supporters group is the Port City Firm. The group was founded in 1997 and stuck together during the team's hiatus year in 2010. A second group, the East Side Ultras, was founded in 2015 and are identified by their sky blue helmets/hats and black shirts.

References

External links

 
Association football clubs established in 1996
Association football clubs disestablished in 2017
Defunct soccer clubs in North Carolina
Sports in Wilmington, North Carolina
Former USL Championship teams
Former USL Second Division teams
1996 establishments in North Carolina
USL League Two teams
2017 disestablishments in North Carolina